Academy of the Holy Names may refer to:
Academy of the Holy Names (Albany, New York)
Academy of the Holy Names (Florida), in Tampa
Academy of the Holy Names (Silver Spring, Maryland)

See also
 Holy Names Academy, Seattle, Washington
 Holy Names High School (disambiguation)
 Holy Name (disambiguation)